Livadi is an abandoned village in the Paphos District of Cyprus.

References

Communities in Paphos District